Cocos Fire, originally known as the Twin Oaks Fire, was a wildfire that ignited on May 14, 2014 in San Marcos, California, in the hills south of California State University, San Marcos. The Cocos Fire quickly spread into western Escondido. The fire destroyed more than 40 buildings, including a dozen single-family homes. The Harmony Grove Spiritualist Association, a 13-acre spiritualist retreat founded in 1896, was particularly hard hit; most of the buildings and residences on the property were destroyed, and the association's president said, "We're pretty much wiped out." Property damage from the fire is estimated at more than $5.7 million. Three minor injuries have been reported. The Cocos Fire was the last of the May 2014 wildfires in San Diego County to be extinguished, with full containment on May 22, 2014.

Fire
The Cocos Fire began at 5:38 PM PDT on May 14, and it had burned  by the evening of the same day. Flames were reported near homes, and the southeastern part of the city was ordered evacuated. By the morning of May 15, the Cocos Fire was the top priority for county firefighters. Additional evacuations were announced. By the morning of May 16, the fire was still only 5% contained. At 6:30 PM PDT on May 22, the Cocos Fire was reported to be 100% contained, after it had reached .

All schools in the San Marcos Unified School District were closed on May 15 and 16. California State University, San Marcos, was evacuated on May 14, along with the surrounding neighborhoods, in the midst of administering spring finals, and remained closed for the rest of the week. Additionally, commencement exercises scheduled for the weekend were also cancelled. Palomar College also closed May 15 and 16, and postponed its commencement ceremonies until the following week.

Investigation and trial 

On July 9, 2014, the San Diego County Sheriff's Department said that they believe the Cocos Fire was intentionally set by a 13-year-old juvenile. She had a hearing set in February 2015, and the trial was held in March 2015. On March 24, the then 14-year-old minor was found guilty of multiple counts of arson and one misdemeanor count of unlawfully allowing a fire to escape one's control. The judge concluded that she "intentionally and maliciously" set a fire in her Washingtonia Avenue backyard in San Marcos, and a blown ember from that Washingtonia Fire started the Cocos Fire. On May 27, the teenager was sentenced to 400 hours of community service, ordered to write letters to all the victims, and pay at least $40,000 in restitution. Additionally, the teen was ordered to enroll in a rehabilitation program known as Breaking Cycles 365, the goal of which is to prevent juveniles from becoming repeat offenders.

Gallery

See also
December 2017 Southern California wildfires
2014 California wildfires
May 2014 San Diego County wildfires
Bernardo Fire

References

External links
Largest fires in San Diego County history - ABC 10News

Wildfires in San Diego County, California
2014 California wildfires